William Chester Goodfellow (born May 25, 1947) is the director of the Afghanistan Peace Campaign, which builds public support for an enduring peace settlement that will end the war, bring U.S. troops home and promote national reconciliation in Afghanistan. Goodfellow has made numerous trips to Kabul to interview Afghan government officials, activists, and academics. In op-ed articles, he has argued that successful implementation of a peace agreement in Afghanistan could serve as a template for resolving other seemingly-intractable conflicts in the Middle East and northern Africa. 

Goodfellow was one of the founders of the Center for International Policy (CIP) in 1975 and served as executive director from 1985 to 2017. Goodfellow testified before congressional committees and published op-ed articles in major U.S. newspapers. During the late 1970s, Goodfellow and his colleagues at CIP successfully lobbied for legislation that requires the executive branch to consider a country’s human rights record before providing economic and military aid.(1)

In the 1980s, Goodfellow promoted negotiations to end the civil wars in Nicaragua and El Salvador. He worked closely with Costa Rican President Oscar Arias and championed the Esquipulas Peace Agreement in the United States. He attended every Central American summit meeting and spoke and published articles about the peace process, which silenced the guns in Central America.(2)

Goodfellow directed Central for International Policy’s Common Defense Campaign to reduce U.S. military spending and change the way America relates to the rest of the world. He was co-chair of the Afghanistan Study Group (2009-2013), which brought together former senior government officials, academics and area specialists. In August 2010, the Afghanistan Study Group issued a report, A New Way Forward: Rethinking U.S. Strategy in Afghanistan that urged the Obama administration to seek a negotiated political settlement in Afghanistan. 

From 1973 to 1975, Goodfellow was an associate at the Indochina Resource Center, a non-profit think tank staffed by academics and activists who produced scholarly research for the anti-Vietnam War movement. In January 1976, the last U.S ambassador to South Vietnam, Ambassador Graham Martin, went before the House International Relations Committee’s Special Subcommittee on Investigations to explain how the anti-war movement turned the American public against the Vietnam War. Ambassador Martin singled out the Indochina Resource Center, which he called, “an enormously effective organization and I do think that they deserve the compliment that I have paid them”.(3)

Goodfellow spent the last six months of the war in Indochina and was evacuated from both Cambodia and Vietnam in April 1975.

Goodfellow earned his undergraduate degree in political science from Boston University in 1970 and received his Masters from the Cambridge-Goddard Graduate School for Social Change in 1972. He has been married to Pulitzer Prize-winning Washington Post journalist Dana Priest since 1989.

References
1. William Goodfellow and James Morrell, testimony before the Subcommittee on International Development Institutions and Finance of the Committee on Banking, Finance and Urban Affairs, House of Representatives, Thursday, March 24th, 1977, pp. 200-218.
2. Thomas W. Walker, ed., Revolution and Counterrevolution in Nicaragua, Westview Press, 1991, pp. 369-393.
3. Ambassador Graham A. Martin, testimony on the Vietnam-Cambodia Emergency, before the Special Subcommittee on Investigations of the Committee on International Relations, House of Representatives, January 27, 1976, pp. 556-557.

Center for International Policy Biography
Foreign Policy In Focus Advisory Board
Latin American Working Group Education Fund Board of Directors
Afghanistan Study Group 

1947 births
Living people
Boston University College of Arts and Sciences alumni
American nonprofit executives
Place of birth missing (living people)